The Hwarang Archery Field is an archery field constructed between November 1985 and January 1986, and then renovated between May and August 1988. It hosted the archery competitions for the 1988 Summer Olympics in Seoul.

References
1988 Summer Olympics official report. Volume 1. Part 1. p. 200.

Venues of the 1988 Summer Olympics
Olympic archery venues
Sports venues in South Korea
Sports venues in Seoul
Venues of the 1986 Asian Games
 Asian Games archery venues